Philip Jaisohn is a bronze statue of Soh Jaipil, in Washington, D.C. Jaipil was a long-time leader in the fight for independence and modernization of Korea, who used the anglicized name Philip Jaison. The statue was dedicated in May 2008. It is located at the Korean Consulate, at 23rd Street and Massachusetts Avenue, Washington, D.C., near the  Korean Embassy. Located in front of the Korean Consulate; 2320 Massachusetts Ave NW, Washington, DC 20008

See also
 List of public art in Washington, D.C., Ward 2

References

External links
http://www.hmdb.org/marker.asp?marker=39925

2008 establishments in Washington, D.C.
2008 sculptures
Bronze sculptures in Washington, D.C.
Jaisohn
Monuments and memorials in Washington, D.C.
Outdoor sculptures in Washington, D.C.
Soh Jaipil
Sculptures of men in Washington, D.C.
Statues in Washington, D.C.